Deshamanya Marhoom Al Haj Mohammed Abdul Bakeer Markar (12 May 1917 – 10 September 1997) was a Sri Lankan politician and civil servant. He was the Speaker of the Parliament of Sri Lanka and Governor of the Southern Province.

Personal life
He was born on 12 May 1917 in Beruwala, Maradana, Sri Lanka. Bakeer Markar's ancestry is traced to Sheik Jamaluddeen-Al-Maghdoomi, an Arab settler who settled down in the sea board town of Beruwala. His father Hakeem Alia Marikkar Mohomed Marikkar belonged to a family of physicians, whose ancestors too were physicians. He started his education at Sri Lanka's first Muslim girls' school in Beruwala and entered St. Sebastian's College, Colombo at the age of 7 to complete his primary education. He completed his secondary education at Zahira College, Colombo and entered law college in 1939 as a law student and graduated in 1949. 

He was married to Sithy Kadija Muhammad Raffai, the daughter of Mr. and Mrs. Omer Lebbe Marikar Muhammed Raffai of China fort, Beruwala. The couple has one son, Imthiaz Bakeer Markar who later went on to serve as Member of Parliament for Beruwala and served as a Government Minister and daughters Dinah, Shamim and Nylah was born to them. Later, he married Jazeela and they had four children, daughters Haseeba, Faseeha, Faheema and son Yazir. 

He died on 10 September 1997 at the age of 80. Later he was buried in his home town of Beruwela.

Career
During his school life at Zahira, he had a close relationship with Dr. Tuan Burhanudeen Jaya, then principal of Zahira College. With the on set of World War II, he took up duties in Civil Defence Services in 1942 and was sent for civil defense training in India. After becoming a Proctor, he thought it was wrong to charge helpless women who came to court for maintenance. He was not charged for appearing in maintenance cases where he often appears in free lawsuits, did not accept the lawsuit out of money. In 1951, Bakeer Markar became the President of the Kalutara Bar Association. 

He started his political career when he was elected member of the Beruwala Urban Council in 1947. He was subsequently elected as the Chairman of the Council. In 1950 he became the Mayor of the Beruwala Municipal Council. He transformed the East and West Municipal Council areas into one Municipal Area. Meanwhile, he was the first to pass a resolution in the Municipal Council that Sinhala should be the official language. In 1960, he contested for the general election and won the Beruwala seat, becoming the first Member of Parliament to represent Beruwala from March 1960 to April 1960. In 1977 general election Bakeer Markar became the first Member of Parliament for Beruwela by a majority of 27,000.

Later he became the Deputy Speaker of the Parliament from 4 August 1977 to 7 September 1978, Then he was appointed as the Speaker of the Parliament of Sri Lanka from 21 September 1978 to 30 August 1983. With that, Bakir Makar became the last Speaker of the old Parliament of Sri Lanka and the first Speaker of the new Parliament of Sri Jayewardenepura. During this period, he was the first to bring the tourism industry, which was limited to the Bentota area, to Beruwela, becoming the Founder of the Beruwala Tourism Zone. During his tenure, new tourism related jobs, jewelry stores, and tourist hotels sprang up in the area as well as tourist police station was also established in the Moragalla area.

After resigned as Speaker on August 31, 1983, he was sworn in as a Cabinet Minister on the same day. In the meantime, he wrote the book Yen Singhalam, which became a cultural pillar among the nations in Sri Lanka. He resigned from Parliament on June 31, 1988 and became the Governor of the Southern Province. He served as acting as the Head of State while the President and Prime Minister both was out of the country. Finally, he resigned as Governor of the Southern Province and political career on December 21, 1993.

Beyond politics
He was founder President of the All Ceylon Union of Muslim League Youth Fronts. He was also the Vice President of the All Ceylon Muslim League. Further he was the Chairman of the Beruwala, Maradana Mosque Jamaath until his demise.

He hails from Maradana, Beruwala where, as historically revealed the early Arabs who arrived in Ceylon (Sailan) built the first ever Mosque in the country, Masjid Al Abrar. He took great pains in renovating Masjid Al Abrar with the help of his village Jamaath. In doing so he was careful in retaining the shape of the original architectural beauty of the Mosque. Bakeer Markar served as a goodwill Ambassador of Sri Lanka. His close connections with the Iraqi government enabled him to build a village in Eravur named Saddam Hussein Village, an area in the Eastern part of the island. He was the founder President of the Iraq-Sri Lanka Friendship Association and remained in this position until his demise.

In the early 1970s, when the plane carrying the Indonesian Haj Pilgrims on return journey crashed in Sri Lanka it was Bakeer Markar, then as Speaker of the Parliament of Sri Lanka, rushed to the scene of the incident and took personal interest to have the bodies of the pilgrims dispatched to Indonesia. As a token of appreciation the President of Indonesia personally invited him to visit his country. The Indonesian Haj Memorial Building at Katunayake was initiated by him.

See also
List of political families in Sri Lanka

References

External links
  Website of the Bakeer Markar Centre for National Unity
 Speakers of Sri Lanka Parliament: Speaker of the Parliament of Sri Lanka
 Bakeer Markar Al Haj M A 

1917 births
1997 deaths
20th-century Sri Lankan lawyers
Alumni of Zahira College, Colombo
Deputy speakers and chairmen of committees of the Parliament of Sri Lanka
Deshamanya
Government ministers of Sri Lanka
Governors of Southern Province, Sri Lanka
Members of the 4th Parliament of Ceylon
Members of the 6th Parliament of Ceylon
Members of the 8th Parliament of Sri Lanka
Speakers of the Parliament of Sri Lanka
United National Party politicians